Francesco Antonio Correr (7 October 1676 - 17 May 1741) was an Italian Roman Catholic bishop and patriarch.

Life
He was born in Venice into the Correr family. He was ordained a priest of the Capuchin Order on 16 April 1730 at Il Redentore. On 1 December 1734 he was made Patriarch of Venice and was consecrated as a bishop on 30 June the following year. He died in 1741 at Villa Correr in Altaura, near Montagnana. His body was taken to Venice and buried in St Mark's Basilica.

References

1676 births
1741 deaths
Patriarchs of Venice
Francesco Antonio
Capuchin bishops